Göteborgs nation is one of the 13 student nations at Uppsala University.

Inspektors 
 Göteborgs nation

Nations at Uppsala University
Student organizations established in the 17th century